Community of Science was a collection of online databases, providing research information to both the public and subscribers, and services for the research community.  It is owned by ProQuest.

History 
Community of Science was founded in 1988 by Johns Hopkins University.

The Community of Science databases were originally hosted online at http://cos.gdb.org/, on the webserver of the GDB Human Genome Database. Community of Science was also accessible via U.S. Department of Agriculture CRIS, National Science Foundation, and Department of Health and Human Services.

 the CEO and president was Huntington Williams, and the organisation was located in Baltimore, Maryland.

Databases 

 Community of Science Expertise
 Community of Science Funding Opportunities – categorised according to a standardised list of keywords

Canadian editions of these databases also existed.

Services 
 Community of Science Funding Alert
 Community of Science Funding News – published biweekly

Access 

The following organisations are subscribed:
 Association of Commonwealth Universities

See also 
 List of funding opportunity databases

References 

Research
Online databases